The Great Australian Camel Race was an Australian event held in 1988.

This event was the work of the Australian millionaire Arthur Earle, who wanted to recognise the positive impact that camels had on the development of Australia, and highlight the importance these animals had in the exploration and transport needs in the central Australian deserts.

It is said to have been the longest animal endurance race ever held.

The event
The race was broken down into six legs each with check points in between. The event was run like a car rally, where each competitor was timed on how long it took to complete a leg. Each leg as detailed in the Australasian geographical magazine Geo Volume 11 number 3 as below.

 Leg 1: Ayers Rock to Alice Spring (Northern Territory 410 km)
 Leg 2: Alice Springs to Boulia (Northern Territory to Queensland 761 km)
 Leg 3: Boulia to Longreach (Queensland app. 604 km)
 Leg 4: Longreach to Charleville (Queensland app. 530 km)
 Leg 5: Charleville to Warwick, Queensland (Queensland app. 1242 km)
 Leg 6: Warwick to Gold Coast (Queensland app. 140 km)

For three months competitors battled disease, floods and competitor rivalry, as the mix of people in the event varied greatly. Australia's elite SASR (Special Air Service Regiment which came second overall) along with the a team from the 2/4 Battalion Royal Australian Regiment, competitors from the United States, Australia's leading camel handlers and ex-marathon runners entered the event totaling 69 competitors.

A total of 28 competitors completed the event with details of finishing times for first second and third place as below.
Gordon O'Connell 480 Hrs
SASR 514 Hrs
Steve French 542 Hrs

Calculating these times into a 24‑hour period, then gaining an average of distance traveled daily equates to Gordon O'Connell taking 20 days in total time to complete, covering 168 km every 24 hours as the average. (This includes meals, sleeping and animal feeding)

Gordon O'Connell won The Great Australian Camel race by approximately 34 hours ahead of his nearest competitor. In addition to this the distance he won by had been reached by the second leg of the race. Gordon won the first four of the six legs, even when he was hospitalised with kidney failure from Shiguella on the second leg going into Boulia.

The army was the team organising the legs and were there for the safety of all competitors along with competing themselves. In addition to this they were the best equipped for the event with hundreds of support personnel and vehicles. The clear leaders throughout the race were the SASR and Gordon O'Connell.

Other social context
It featured in the four-hour documentary produced by Orana Films and photographed in the Australasian geographical magazine Geo Volume 11 number 3 page 97.

The race was to also inject more celebration into Australia's Bicentennial year whilst raising funds for the Royal Flying Doctor Service.

See also
 Camels in Australia

Notes

After the event Gordon went to retire the camel for her efforts when a dispute broke out over ownership of Carla. Because she had won one of the longest race events in history, the original person Gordon was involved with before the race, made claim to her and wanted to use her name to start his camel business. After close to six years Gordon was awarded ownership of the camel and she resides with him to this day in retirement.

References
1. Orlando Sentinel - April 24, 1988 Darwin, Australia - Camel Race Begins. Drivers from 11 countries mounted 68 camels

2. National Library of Australia - 1988, English, Video edition: The Great camel race [videorecording] : the longest animal endurance race ever.

3. Paddy McHugh - Bicentennial Camel Race

4. Fred Brophy (2014) The last showman, Penguin Books LTD, Australia, 

1988 establishments in Australia
Recurring sporting events established in 1988
Animal racing
Camels
Sports competitions in Australia
1988 in Australian sport
Australian bicentennial commemorations
Sport in the Northern Territory
Sport in Queensland